Michela Battiston (born 15 September 1997) is an Italian fencer. She competed in the women's team sabre event at the 2020 Summer Olympics.

References

External links
 

1997 births
Living people
Italian female fencers
Olympic fencers of Italy
Fencers at the 2020 Summer Olympics
People from Palmanova
Sportspeople from Friuli-Venezia Giulia
Universiade medalists in fencing
Universiade gold medalists for France
Universiade bronze medalists for France
Medalists at the 2019 Summer Universiade
20th-century Italian women
21st-century Italian women